Indosylvirana is a genus of ranid frogs endemic to South and Southeast Asia.

Species
There are 13 species:
 Indosylvirana aurantiaca (Boulenger, 1904)
 Indosylvirana caesari (Biju, Mahony, Wijayathilaka, Senevirathne, and Meegaskumbura, 2014)
 Indosylvirana doni (Biju, Garg, Mahony, Wijayathilaka, Senevirathne, and Meegaskumbura, 2014)
 Indosylvirana flavescens (Jerdon, 1853)
 Indosylvirana indica (Biju, Garg, Mahony, Wijayathilaka, Senevirathne, and Meegaskumbura, 2014)
 Indosylvirana intermedia (Rao, 1937)
 Indosylvirana magna (Biju, Garg, Mahony, Wijayathilaka, Senevirathne, and Meegaskumbura, 2014)
 Indosylvirana montana (Rao, 1922)
 Indosylvirana serendipi (Biju, Garg, Mahony, Wijayathilaka, Senevirathne, and Meegaskumbura, 2014)
 Indosylvirana sreeni (Biju, Garg, Mahony, Wijayathilaka, Senevirathne, and Meegaskumbura, 2014)
 Indosylvirana temporalis (Günther, 1864)
 Indosylvirana urbis (Biju, Garg, Mahony, Wijayathilaka, Senevirathne, and Megaskumbara, 2014)

References

 
Amphibian genera
True frogs